The following list of presidents of the Chamber of Representatives of Colombia lists the presidents of the Chamber of Representatives of Colombia since 1979.

See also
 List of presidents of the Senate of Colombia
 List of vice presidents of Colombia
 List of presidents of Colombia
 List of viceroys of New Granada

Colombia, Chamber
Chamber of Representatives

es:Cámara de Representantes de Colombia#Presidentes de la Cámara de Representantes